The Albuquerque–Santa Fe–Las Vegas combined statistical area (known as the Santa Fe–Española combined statistical area until 2013) is made up of eight counties in north central New Mexico. The combined statistical area consists of the Albuquerque and Santa Fe metropolitan statistical areas, and the Las Vegas, Los Alamos, and Española micropolitan statistical areas. The 2013 delineations included the Grants micropolitan statistical area, but it was removed in the 2018 revisions. As of the 2020 census, the CSA had a population of 1,162,523. Roughly 56% of New Mexico's residents live in this area. Prior to the 2013 redefinitions, the CSA consisted only of the Santa Fe metropolitan statistical area and the Española micropolitan statistical area.

Counties
Bernalillo County
Los Alamos County
Rio Arriba County
Sandoval County
San Miguel County
Santa Fe County
Torrance County
Valencia County

Communities

Bernalillo County

Los Alamos County

Rio Arriba County

Sandoval County

San Miguel County

Santa Fe County

Torrance County

Valencia County

See also
List of metropolitan areas in New Mexico
List of micropolitan areas in New Mexico
List of cities in New Mexico

References

Metropolitan areas of New Mexico
Santa Fe County, New Mexico
Rio Arriba County, New Mexico
Bernalillo County, New Mexico
Sandoval County, New Mexico
San Miguel County, New Mexico
Cibola County, New Mexico
Los Alamos County, New Mexico
Valencia County, New Mexico
Torrance County, New Mexico
Combined statistical areas of the United States